The 1971–72 UEFA Cup was the inaugural year of the UEFA Cup (now known as the UEFA Europa League), which effectively replaced the Inter-Cities Fairs Cup.

It was won by English side Tottenham Hotspur over their countrymen Wolverhampton Wanderers 3–2 on aggregate after a two-legged final.

The tournament was open to the highest-placed European teams that had not qualified for the European Cup or UEFA Cup Winners' Cup. It commenced on 14 September 1971 and concluded on 17 May 1972.

A total of 64 football clubs entered the first round draw. 

The tournament's top scorer was Ludwig Bründl of Eintracht Braunschweig with ten goals.

Bracket

First round
Teams from the same nation could not be drawn against one another.

Summary 
First legs were played on 14–16 September 1971 (except one match which was played on 22 September). Second legs were played on 29–30 September 1971 (except one match which was played on 6 October).

|}
1 Vllaznia withdrew after Austrian immigration officials declined to issue visas for their team to enter the country.
2 This match was played in Reykjavík.
3 Chemie Halle withdrew after the first leg following the Hotel 't Silveren Seepaerd fire.

Matches

Vllaznia withdrew after Austrian immigration officials declined to issue visas for their team to enter the country; Rapid Wien were awarded a walkover.

Ferencváros won 4–2 on aggregate.

ADO Den Haag won 7–2 on aggregate.

Tottenham Hotspur won 15–1 on aggregate.

Eintracht Braunschweig won 7–1 on aggregate.

2–2 on aggregate; Vitória de Setúbal won on away goals.

Carl Zeiss Jena won 4–3 on aggregate.

UTA Arad won 5–4 on aggregate.

OFK Beograd won 6–3 on aggregate.

Juventus won 11–0 on aggregate.

Vasas won 2–1 on aggregate.

Zaglebie Walbrzych won 4–2 on aggregate.

Spartak Moscow won 3–2 on aggregate.

Željezničar won 4–3 on aggregate.

Dinamo Zagreb won 8–2 on aggregate.

St Johnstone won 4–2 on aggregate.

Hertha won 7–2 on aggregate.

Rosenborg won 4–0 on aggregate.

Real Madrid won 4–2 on aggregate.

Chemie Halle withdrew ahead of the return leg due to the Eindhoven hotel fire that claimed the life of Halle's 21-year-old midfielder Wolfgang Hoffmann one day before the match. PSV were awarded a walkover.

Lierse won 4–2 on aggregate.

Aberdeen won 3–0 on aggregate.

Köln won 3–2 on aggregate.

Dundee won 5–2 on aggregate.

Legia Warsaw won 3–1 on aggregate.

Athletic Bilbao won 3–2 on aggregate.

Wolverhampton Wanderers won 7–1 on aggregate.

Rapid București won 2–1 on aggregate.

Bologna won 3–1 on aggregate.

Nantes won 3–1 on aggregate.

2–2 on aggregate; Panionios won on away goals.

Milan won 7–0 on aggregate.

Second round
Teams from the same nation could not be drawn against one another.

Summary
First legs were played on 19–21 October 1971. Second legs were played on 2–4 November 1971.

|}
1 After the final whistle in the first leg, visiting Panionios fans invaded the pitch and attacked Ferencváros players, match officials, and Hungarian police. Panionios were ejected from the competition.
2 This match was played in 's-Hertogenbosch.

Matches

Rapid București won 4–2 on aggregate.

Dundee won 5–4 on aggregate.

UTA Arad won 3–2 on aggregate.

Carl Zeiss Jena won 5–1 on aggregate.

2–2 on aggregate; Rapid Wien won on away goals.

3–3 on aggregate; Željezničar won on away goals.

After the final whistle in the first leg, visiting Panionios fans invaded the pitch and attacked Ferencváros players, match officials, and Hungarian police. Panionios were ejected from the competition. Ferencváros were awarded a walkover.

Eintracht Braunschweig won 4–3 on aggregate.

4–4 on aggregate; Lierse won on away goals.

Wolverhampton Wanderers won 7–1 on aggregate.

Tottenham Hotspur won 1–0 on aggregate.

St Johnstone won 2–1 on aggregate.

Milan won 5–4 on aggregate.

3–3 on aggregate; PSV won on away goals.

Vitória de Setúbal won 4–0 on aggregate.

Juventus won 3–1 on aggregate.

Third round
Teams from the same nation could not be drawn against one another.

Summary
First legs were played on 23–24 November 1971. Second legs were played on 8 and 15 December 1971.

|}

Matches

Wolverhampton Wanderers won 4–0 on aggregate.

UTA Arad won 3–1 on aggregate.

Juventus won 5–1 on aggregate.

Ferencváros won 6–3 on aggregate.

Lierse won 4–1 on aggregate.

Željezničar won 5–2 on aggregate.

Milan won 3–2 on aggregate.

Tottenham Hotspur won 5–0 on aggregate.

Quarter-finals

Summary
First legs were played on 23 February, 7 and 9 March 1972. Second legs were played on 7, 21 and 22 March 1972.

|}

Matches

Milan won 3–1 on aggregate.

Tottenham Hotspur won 3–1 on aggregate.

Wolverhampton Wanderers won 3–2 on aggregate.

3–3 on aggregate; Ferencváros won 5–4 on penalties.

Semi-finals

Summary
First legs were played on 5 April 1972. Second legs were played on 19 April 1972.

|}

Matches

Wolverhampton Wanderers won 4-3 on aggregate.

Tottenham Hotspur won 3-2 on aggregate.

Final

Summary
The first leg was played on 3 May 1972, with the second two weeks later on 17 May.

|}

Matches

Tottenham Hotspur won 3–2 on aggregate.

See also
1971–72 European Cup
1971–72 European Cup Winners' Cup

References

External links
Season Overview – UEFA.com
1971–72 All matches UEFA Cup – season at UEFA website
Results at RSSSF.com
1971/72 UEFA Cup - results and line-ups (archive)

UEFA Cup seasons
2